Dong'an chicken is a Chinese cold parboiled chicken dish, flavoured with chili peppers, ground sichuan peppercorns, white rice vinegar, scallions and ginger. It is named after Dong'an County.  It is one of the signature dishes of Hunan chefs.

Dong'an chicken is a traditional Hunan dish, which started in the Tang Dynasty. In February 1972, when the then U.S. President Richard Nixon visited China, Mao Zedong entertained Nixon with Hunan dishes such as Dong'an chicken at a banquet.

It has evolved through three dynasties, named "Mature vinegar chicken" in the Western Jin Dynasty, "Guanbao chicken" in the late Qing Dynasty, and "Dong'an chicken" in the Republic of China.

References

Hunan cuisine
Chicken dishes